Vito Cruz station is a railway station located on the South Main Line in the city of Manila, Philippines.

Vito Cruz is the eighth station from Tutuban and is the last station on the South Main Line physically located in the city of Manila.

History
Vito Cruz, together with Buendia, was opened on November 24, 1975 as part of the 83rd anniversary of the Philippine National Railways.

Nearby landmarks
The station serves the district of San Andres in Manila, as well as nearby barangays San Antonio, La Paz, and Palanan in Makati. Further away from the station are educational institutions such as the main campus of Arellano University School of Law, the De La Salle University, the De La Salle–College of Saint Benilde and St. Scholastica's College, the Manila South Cemetery and Circuit Makati.

Transportation links
Vito Cruz station is accessible by jeepneys plying the Zobel Roxas Street route, as well as buses on the Osmeña Highway. A tricycle terminal plying barangay San Antonio in Makati is located across the station on Zobel Roxas Street, while tricycles based in Manila and barangay Palanan, Makati also drop commuters off at the station.

Station Layout

Philippine National Railways stations
Railway stations in Metro Manila
Railway stations opened in 2009
Buildings and structures in San Andres, Manila